Bhatenda is a census town in the Rajarhat CD block in the  Bidhannagar subdivision of the North 24 Parganas district in the state of West Bengal, India.

Geography

Location                            

Area overview
Rajarhat, a rural area earlier, adjacent to Kolkata, is being transformed into an upmarket satellite township, with modern business hubs, luxury real estate and eye-catching shopping malls. With enormous construction activity taking place all around, things are changing fast, leaving behind a description at any given point of time as outdated in no time. Bidhannagar subdivision consists of Bidhannagar Municipality, Mahishbathan II Gram Panchayat and Rajarhat-Gopalpur Municipality (subsequently merged to form Bidhannagar Municipal Corporation since 2015), including Nabadiganta Industrial Township (Bidhannagar Sector - V) and Rajarhat (Community development block).

Note: The map alongside presents some of the notable locations in the subdivision. All places marked in the map are linked in the larger full screen map.

Demographics
According to the 2011 Census of India, Bhatenda had a total population of 6,349, of which 3,231 (51%) were males and 3,116 (49%) were females. Population in the age range 0–6 years was 542. The total number of literate persons in  Bhatenda was 5,419 (93.32% of the population over 6 years).

Infrastructure
According to the District Census Handbook, North Twenty Four Parganas,  2011, Bhatenda covered an area of 1.1086 km2. The protected water-supply involved tap water from treated sources, tank, pond, lake. It had 639 domestic electric connections. Among the educational facilities, it had 4 primary schools, 3 middle schools, 3 secondary schools, 3 senior secondary schools. The nearest college was 5 km away at Gopalpur. It had 3 recognised shorthand, typewriting and vocational training institutions. Among the social, cultural and recreational facilities, it had 1 cinema theatre, 1 auditorium/community hall, 1 public library. It had branch offices of 1 nationalised bank and 1 cooperative bank.

Healthcare
Rekjoani Rural Hospital at Rekjuani with 30 beds functions as the main medical facility in Rajarhat CD block.

References

Cities and towns in North 24 Parganas district